A.D.M. is the second studio album by New Zealand indie rock group Snapper, released in 1996.

Critical reception
Stylus Magazine wrote that "the deceptively simple verse/chorus/verse structure of the songs masks Gutteridge’s fearless experimentation into background distortion."

Track listing
"Tomcat"
"Hammerhead"
"Small Town Secret"
"Demon"
"Hotchkiss"
"A.D.M."
"Killzone 44"
"Stalker"
"Lock and Load"
"Used to Know Her Name"

Personnel
Snapper
Mike Dooley – drums
Peter Gutteridge – guitar, keyboards, vocals, producer

Additional personnel
Demarnia Lloyd – vocals
Celia Pavlova – vocals
Christine Voice – vocals

References

Snapper (band) albums
1996 albums
Flying Nun Records albums
Dunedin Sound albums